Calum or Callum MacDonald is the name of:

 Callum Macdonald (1912–1999), Scottish publisher
 Callum MacDonald (born 1983), Scottish footballer
 Calum Macdonald (footballer) (born 1997), English-born Scottish footballer for Tranmere Rovers
 Calum MacDonald (musician) (born 1953), Scottish musician in the band Runrig
 Calum MacDonald (politician) (born 1956), Scottish politician, Labour MP for the Western Isles, 1987–2005
 Malcolm MacDonald (music critic) (1948–2014), alias Calum MacDonald, Scottish author
Malky MacDonald (1913–1999), alias Calum MacDonald, football player and manager